Mariia Pomazan (Ukrainian: Марія Олександрівна Помазан; born 15 October 1988) is a Ukrainian Paralympic athlete.  She competes in throwing events in the F35 classification for athletes with cerebral palsy. , she holds Women's F35 world records for shot put and discus.

Pomazan started athletics at age 19 and made her international debut in 2010. At the 2011 IPC Athletics World Championships in Christchurch, she won two gold medals with F35 world record throws in both shot put and discus. She broke both these world records at the 2012 Summer Paralympics in London.

In London, a miscalculation of the Raza Points System in the combined F35/F36 discus event caused extended confusion and protest. Pomazan was initially awarded the gold medal over world record breaking F36 athlete Wu Qing, then relegated to silver. One official described the situation as "a shambles." A second medal ceremony was held, which Pomazan refused to attend. Several days later she was required to return the discus gold medal. Pomazan later won gold in Women's Shot Put - F35/36.

At the 2013 IPC Athletics World Championships in Lyon, Pomazan won the F35/36 shot put and discus events, breaking her own F35 World records in both events.

References

External links 
 

1988 births
Living people
Paralympic gold medalists for Ukraine
Paralympic silver medalists for Ukraine
Paralympic athletes of Ukraine
Athletes (track and field) at the 2012 Summer Paralympics
Athletes (track and field) at the 2016 Summer Paralympics
Athletes (track and field) at the 2020 Summer Paralympics
Medalists at the 2012 Summer Paralympics
Medalists at the 2016 Summer Paralympics
Medalists at the 2020 Summer Paralympics
World record holders in Paralympic athletics
Cerebral Palsy category Paralympic competitors
Paralympic medalists in athletics (track and field)
Ukrainian female shot putters
Ukrainian female discus throwers
Medalists at the World Para Athletics Championships
21st-century Ukrainian women